Aurora Cecilia Santiago Cisneros (born 19 October 1994) is a Mexican professional footballer who plays as a goalkeeper for Tigres UANL (women) and the Mexico women's national team. By playing in the 2011 FIFA Women's World Cup in Germany at the age of 16 years and 251 days, she became the youngest-ever goalkeeper to appear in a World Cup.

Playing career

Club
Santiago was born in Los Reyes la Paz, part of the Greater Mexico City area. She started playing for the women's team of Club Santos Laguna in the Super Liga Femenil de Fútbol in October 2010. In 2013, she signed for the Boston Breakers in the National Women's Soccer League. In February 2016, Santiago signed for Icelandic top division team Þór Akureyri.

International
Having played twice in the group stages of the 2010 CONCACAF Women's Gold Cup, which acted as the qualifying state for the 2011 World Cup for CONCACAF nations, Santiago made her World Cup debut on 27 June 2011 at the age of 16 as Mexico played England at the Volkswagen Arena in Wolfsburg, becoming the youngest goalkeeper ever to appear in a men's or women's international tournament. The game ended in a 1–1 draw, Mexico's first ever point at a World Cup.

The year before she had been the youngest player at the July 2010 U20 Women's World Cup (also played in Germany), when she played for Mexico women's national under-20 football team at the age of 15 years and nine months. Expected to go out in the first stage, the team reached the quarter finals, with Santiago's performances considered a vital factor in the team's surprising success in getting through the group stage. Earlier in the year, she had been part of the Mexico U17 team that reached the final of the CONCACAF U17 Championships in March, losing 1–0 to Canada.

Two years previously, she had been the youngest player at the 2008 U20 World Cup in Chile, featuring in the Mexico squad less than two months after her fourteenth birthday.

Personal life
Santiago was originally a defender but switched at the age of six despite opposition from her dad. She is the only player to be part of a squad for four FIFA U-20 Women's World Cup, and has played in three of those tournaments 2010, 2012, and 2014.

References

External links
 
 Profile at Mexican Football Federation 
 
 
 

1994 births
Living people
People from Nezahualcóyotl
Footballers from the State of Mexico
Mexican women's footballers
Women's association football goalkeepers
National Women's Soccer League players
Boston Breakers players
FC Kansas City players
Apollon Ladies F.C. players
Cecilia Santiago
Cecilia Santiago
Liga MX Femenil players
Club América (women) footballers
Eredivisie (women) players
PSV (women) players
Mexico women's international footballers
2011 FIFA Women's World Cup players
2015 FIFA Women's World Cup players
Pan American Games bronze medalists for Mexico
Pan American Games medalists in football
Footballers at the 2011 Pan American Games
Medalists at the 2011 Pan American Games
Footballers at the 2019 Pan American Games
Mexican expatriate women's footballers
Mexican expatriate sportspeople in the United States
Expatriate women's soccer players in the United States
Mexican expatriate sportspeople in Cyprus
Expatriate women's footballers in Cyprus
Mexican expatriate sportspeople in Iceland
Expatriate women's footballers in Iceland
Mexican expatriate sportspeople in the Netherlands
Expatriate women's footballers in the Netherlands
Mexican footballers